FC Turbina Naberezhnye Chelny was a Russian football team from Naberezhnye Chelny.

It played professionally in the third-tier Soviet Second League from 1977 to 1987. Their best result was 8th spot in their zone in 1983.

Team name history
1973–1983: FC Turbina Naberezhnye Chelny
1982–1987: FC Turbina Brezhnev (the city was renamed temporarily)
2000: FC Turbina-KamGIFK Naberezhnye Chelny
2001: FC Turbina Naberezhnye Chelny

External links
  Team history by footballfacts

Association football clubs established in 1973
Association football clubs disestablished in 2002
Defunct football clubs in Russia
Sport in Naberezhnye Chelny
1973 establishments in the Soviet Union
2002 disestablishments in Russia